The 1966 Waynesburg Yellow Jackets football team was an American football team that represented Waynesburg College as a member of the West Penn Conference (WPC) during the 1966 NAIA football season. In their first year under head coach Carl DePasqua, the Yellow Jackets compiled a perfect 11–0 record (2–0 against conference opponents) and won the WPC championship. During the regular season, the Yellow Jackets ranked among the best teams in small college football, averaging 149.4 yards in total defense and 40.2 yards in rushing defense.

Running back Rich Dahar was named to the Associated Press 1966 All-Pennsylvania football team. Dahar rushed for 233 yards, rand for three touchdowns, and passed for another in the Champion Bowl.  Fullback Rich Ripepi was another key player. Three Waynesburg players went on to play in the NFL: end Don Herrmann (nine seasons in the NFL); end Dave Smith (four seasons); and guard Joe Righetti (two seasons).

The team played its home games in Waynesburg, Pennsylvania.

Schedule

References

Waynesburg
Waynesburg Yellow Jackets football seasons
NAIA Football National Champions
Waynesburg Yellow Jackets football